Adina Thembi Ndamse (born 3 October) better known by her stage name Adina is a Ghanaian-South African singer, songwriter, actress and sometimes a model. She was the winner of music reality show Stars of the Future in 2008. Her eighth music single titled "Too Late" won her two awards – Record of the Year and Best Female Vocalist of the Year at the 2018 Vodafone Ghana Music Awards in Ghana. In March 2021, she was among the Top 30 Most Influential Women in Music by the 3Music Awards Women's Brunch.

Early life and music career
Adina started singing when she was a young girl. She had her senior high school education at the Wesley Girls High School and then moved to Central University where she obtained a degree in Environmental and Development Studies. Growing up as a kid she joined the National Theater Choir where she got to perform at Kidafest and Fun World shows.

She shot to prominence in the Ghana music scene when she competed in the music reality show 'Stars of the Future' organized by Charter House Ghana and eventually became the winner.

She performed online concerts during the COVID-19 lock down.

Awards and nominations

Ghana Music Awards

|-
|rowspan="1"|2021
|rowspan="1"|Herself
|Artiste of the Year
|
|-
|rowspan="1"|2021
|rowspan="1"|Araba
|Album of the Year
|
|-
|rowspan="1"|2021
|rowspan="1"|Herself
|Best Afrobeats/Afropop Artiste of the Year
|
|-
|rowspan="1"|2021
|rowspan="1"|Take care of you ft Stonebwoy
|Collaboration of the Year
|
|-
|rowspan="1"|2021
|rowspan="1"|Hear me
|Best Female Vocal Performance of the Year
|
|-
|rowspan="1"|2021
|rowspan="1"|Daddy's Little girl
|Record of the Year
|
|-
|rowspan="1"|2021
|rowspan="1"|Adina-Hyedin
|Songwriter of the Year
|
|-
|rowspan="1"|2021
|rowspan="1"|Why
|Best Music Song of the Year
|
|-
|rowspan="1"|2021
|rowspan="1"|Take care of you ft. Stonebwoy
|Best Afrobeats/Afropop Song of the Year
|
|-
|rowspan="1"|2021
|rowspan="1"|Why
|Best Reggae Dancehall Song of the Year
|
|-
|rowspan="1"|2020
|rowspan="1"|Herself
|Record of the Year
|
|-
|rowspan="1"|2018
|rowspan="1"|Herself
|Best Female Vocalist of the Year
|
|-
|rowspan="1"|2017
|rowspan="1"|Herself
|Afropop Song of the Year
|
|-
|rowspan="1"|2017
|rowspan="1"|Herself
|Best Female Vocalist
|
|-
|rowspan="1"|2016
|rowspan="1"|Herself
|Record of the Year
|
|-
|rowspan="1"|2016
|rowspan="1"|Herself
|Afropop Song of the Year
|
|-
|rowspan="1"|2016
|rowspan="1"|Herself
|Best Female Vocalist of Year
|

Entertainment Achievement Awards 
In March 2021, she was awarded the 'Best Female Artiste' of the Year category in the Entertainment Achievement Awards.

3Music Awards 
In March 2021, her song WHY was the Reggae Dancehall Song of the Year in the 3Music Awards.

Vodafone Ghana Music Awards

References

Living people
1989 births
People educated at Wesley Girls' Senior High School
21st-century Ghanaian women singers
21st-century Ghanaian singers
Central University (Ghana) alumni